Joaquín Vargas (born 19 February 2002) is a Peruvian swimmer. He won a bronze medal in the men's 400 metre freestyle at the 2021 South American Swimming Championships. He competed in the 2020 Summer Olympics.

References

External links
 

2002 births
Living people
Swimmers at the 2020 Summer Olympics
Peruvian male freestyle swimmers
Olympic swimmers of Peru
Pan American Games competitors for Peru
Swimmers at the 2019 Pan American Games
21st-century Peruvian people
People from Piura